Luca Chirico (born 16 July 1992) is an Italian former professional racing cyclist, who competed as a professional from 2014 to 2022.

Major results

2009
 8th Overall Vuelta al Besaya
2010
 1st Overall 3Tre Bresciana
 1st GP dell'Arno
 1st Stage 2 Grand Prix Général Patton
 5th Trofeo Città di Loano
2012
 8th Gran Premio di Poggiana
2013
 1st Gran Premio San Giuseppe
 2nd Ruota d'Oro
 4th Trofeo Alcide Degasperi
2014
 2nd Circuito de Getxo
 3rd Road race, National Under-23 Road Championships
 3rd Giro del Belvedere
 3rd Gran Premio di Poggiana
 5th Tour de Berne
 6th Coppa della Pace
 7th Grand Prix Sarajevo
 9th Giro di Toscana
 10th Overall Tour de Serbie
2015
 7th Overall Tour de Langkawi
2016
 9th Overall Tour de Langkawi
2017
 2nd Overall Tour de Serbie
1st Stage 2
 2nd Overall Tour of Bihor
 5th Overall Tour of Ankara
 8th Overall Tour of Qinghai Lake
2021
 6th Classic Grand Besançon Doubs
 8th Giro dell'Appennino

Grand Tour general classification results timeline

References

External links
 

1992 births
Living people
Italian male cyclists
Cyclists from Varese